Débora Cristiane de Oliveira (born 20 October 1991), known as Debinha Miri or simply Debinha, is a Brazilian professional football forward who plays for the Kansas City Current in the National Women's Soccer League and the Brazil women's national football team.

Club career
When Rosana transferred to Avaldsnes in August 2013, she asked the Norwegian club to sign Debinha too. Debinha became top-scorer of the 2014 Toppserien.

At the end of 2014, she had a short loan spell between November and December together with Rosana at São José during the club's successful attempt to win both Copa Libertadores Femenina and International Women's Club Championship during that year. She returned to Norway at the beginning of 2015.

From February 2016 to January 2017, she played for Dalian Quanjian in the Chinese Women's Super League.

Debinha signed with the Western New York Flash of the United States-based National Women's Soccer League on 5 January 2017, days before the franchise announced that it had been sold and would be moved from Rochester, New York, to Cary, North Carolina. Debinha reportedly wasn't informed of the franchise's plans to move when she was signed. She reported to North Carolina and was made a starting midfielder from the start of their season, and scored the Courage's first goal in their home stadium.

Debinha appeared in every regular season game for the Courage in 2017 and scored four goals. She started the semi-final game against the Chicago Red Stars but was forced to leave the game after dislocating her elbow in the 10th minute. This injury forced her to miss the Championship game, which the Courage lost 1–0 to the Portland Thorns.

In 2018, Debinha was named to the NWSL Team of the Month for March. She scored eight goals during the regular season, helping the Courage win their second straight NWSL Shield. Debinha was named to the 2018 NWSL Second XI. During the playoffs, she was in the starting line-up for the semi-final and final. Debinha scored in the 13th minute of the Championship game as North Carolina beat the Portland Thorns 3–0 to win the 2018 NWSL Championship.

During the 2019 season, Debinha played 21 games throughout the regular season and playoffs. During this span, she scored ten goals (eight regular season and two postseason) and tallied seven assists. She was named to the NWSL Team of the Month for July, August, and September. During the first round of the playoffs, Debinha scored the game-winning goal in extra time to help The Courage advance past Reign FC. In the final, Debinha scored the first goal (and eventual game winner) against the Chicago Red Stars, with her performance earning her the Championship Game MVP Award. In December 2022, Debinha confirmed her departure from Courage. In January 2023, it was announced that she had signed a two-year contract with the Kansas City Current.

International career

After representing Brazil in the 2010 FIFA U-20 Women's World Cup, Debinha made her senior debut on 18 October 2011 in a 2–0 win over Argentina at the 2011 Pan American Games in Guadalajara. She was named as an alternate for the Brazil squad at the 2012 London Olympics.

In December 2013, Debinha scored twice in a 3–1 win over Scotland at the 2013 Torneio Internacional de Brasília de Futebol Feminino.

She also represented Brazil at the 2016 Olympics.

Debinha was one of four NWSL players called up to represent Brazil in the 2019 FIFA Women's World Cup held in France.

On 18 February 2021, Debinha played her 100th match for Brazil in a 4–1 win over Argentina in the 2021 SheBelieves Cup.

International goals

Honors
North Carolina Courage
NWSL Champions: 2018, 2019
NWSL Shield: 2017, 2018, 2019
NWSL Challenge Cup: 2022
Brazil
Copa América Femenina: 2018, 2022
Individual

 NWSL Best XI: 2022

NWSL Second XI: 2018
NWSL Championship Game MVP: 2019
NWSL Challenge Cup MVP: 2021, 2022
NWSL Challenge Top scorer: 2021

 IFFHS CONMEBOL Woman Team of the Decade 2011–2020

Personal life

Debinha is openly lesbian, having a relationship with Meredith Speck, her North Carolina Courage's teammate.

References

External links

 
 
 

1991 births
Living people
Brazilian women's footballers
Footballers at the 2016 Summer Olympics
Brazil women's international footballers
Brazilian expatriate women's footballers
Expatriate women's footballers in Norway
Brazilian expatriate sportspeople in Norway
Toppserien players
Associação Desportiva Centro Olímpico players
Olympic footballers of Brazil
Women's association football forwards
North Carolina Courage players
Brazilian expatriate sportspeople in the United States
Saad Esporte Clube (women) players
Dalian Quanjian F.C. players
Chinese Women's Super League players
Brazilian expatriate sportspeople in China
Expatriate women's footballers in China
National Women's Soccer League players
Universiade bronze medalists for Brazil
Universiade medalists in football
2019 FIFA Women's World Cup players
Medalists at the 2011 Summer Universiade
FIFA Century Club
Footballers at the 2020 Summer Olympics
Pan American Games medalists in football
Footballers at the 2011 Pan American Games
Pan American Games silver medalists for Brazil
Medalists at the 2011 Pan American Games
Kansas City Current players